Barry Edward Traynor (born 9 December 1946) is a former Australian politician.

He was born in Ararat and attended Ararat High School before working as a bank teller from 1964 to 1965. In 1966 he joined the Police Force, where he remained until 1992. He received his Higher School Certificate from Ballarat High School in 1980, and was awarded the National Medal and the Police Service Good Conduct Medal. He joined the Liberal Party in 1988 as a member of the Wendouree branch, and in 1992 was elected to the Victorian Legislative Assembly as the member for Ballarat East. He served until his defeat in 1999, whereupon he returned to the police service.

References

1946 births
Living people
Liberal Party of Australia members of the Parliament of Victoria
Members of the Victorian Legislative Assembly
People educated at Ballarat High School